Finlay Hamilton Carson (born 18 October 1967) is a Scottish Conservative Party politician serving as Convener of the Rural Affairs, Islands and Natural Environment Committee since 2021. He has been the Member of the Scottish Parliament (MSP) for the Galloway and West Dumfries since 2016.

Early life and education
Carson was born in Twynholm on 18 October 1967. He attended Twynholm Primary School and later Kirkcudbright Academy. Carson then went to study at the University of Aberdeen where he graduated with a BSc Agriculture. Carson and his brother ran an IT business together. Carson lives with wife Jackie and has 4 children.

Political career
Carson, from 2012, was a councillor for Castle Douglas and Glenkens. He succeeded Peter Duncan who was the former MP for Galloway and Upper Nithsdale.

In 2015 he stood for the UK Parliament as the Conservative candidate for the Dumfries and Galloway constituency where he was unsuccessful and came second to the SNP's Richard Arkless by 11.5% of the vote.

In 2016 he stood for the Scottish Parliament in Galloway and West Dumfries, in place of the retiring Conservative MSP Alex Fergusson. He successfully held the seat for the Conservatives and had a majority of 1,514 votes (4.5%) over his SNP rival Aileen McLeod with a swing of 0.8% from the SNP to the Conservatives.

Carson is the Scottish Conservative spokesperson for Digital Economy, Animal Welfare and Biodiversity. He also sits on the Environment, Climate Change and Land Reform Committee of the Scottish Parliament.

At the 2021 Scottish Parliament election Carson was re-elected as MSP for Galloway and West Dumfries with an increased majority of 2,635 votes over the SNP's Emma Harper who finished in second place.  Carson said he was "absolutely delighted" his vote share increased and while he thought "Indyref2 played some part in some people’s votes" he attributed his victory it to people supporting his position of challenging the Scottish Government on issues relating to "investment in the south-west and particularly in the west of the region in Stranraer".

On 12 January 2022, Carson called for Boris Johnson to resign as Conservative party leader and Prime Minister over the Westminster lockdown parties controversy along with a majority of Scottish Conservative MSPs.

References

External links 
 

1967 births
Living people
People from Dumfries and Galloway
People educated at Kirkcudbright Academy
Alumni of the University of Aberdeen
Conservative MSPs
Members of the Scottish Parliament 2016–2021
Members of the Scottish Parliament 2021–2026
Scottish Conservative Party councillors
Councillors in Dumfries and Galloway